Heinz Bigler may refer to:

 Heinz Bigler (footballer, born 1925) (1925–2002), Swiss football midfielder and manager
 Heinz Bigler (footballer, born 1949) (1949–2021), Swiss football defender and manager